One Peking Road is a prominent 30-floor office building in Peking Road, Tsim Sha Tsui, Kowloon, Hong Kong.

History
The developer for the project was Glorious Sun Group who paid HK$1.24 billion for the site at a government auction in April 1998. The skyscraper, which was designed by Rocco Design Architects, was built by Gammon Construction and completed in 2003. It features shops, restaurants and office space. The building was awarded the HKIA Medal of the Year in 2003.

References

Office buildings completed in 2003
Tsim Sha Tsui